Emanuele Corocher  is an Italian writer born in Verona, Italy, living and working in Verona, Italy.
His novel "Morire a Marcinelle" published by Tra le righe libri for the social theme and for the memory of the terrible disaster that took place in Marcinelle.

He wrote the books: “Il Piccolo Popolo e il pianeta Terra” and “Cento anni di eroismi sconosciuti”, in 2015.
In 2016 he also wrote the folklore story: “Euro Carnevale 2016 - Storia di due famosi Carnevali” . He wrote the sylloge: “Spirale di farfalle” in the same year.  Some of his lyrics were published in the poetic anthology “Il vento della poesia” created by the Carta e Penna Cultural Association. It is included in the anthology Riviera Laurence Olivier Vivien Leigh Award 2016. His art work was realized by Andrea Torresani. 
In the Solidarity Anthology - Various Authors - Lo Dono from me. CTL publisher. His writings are also present in the anthology Literary Poetry: Pianeta Donna. 
Created by the Cultural Association La Pergola Arte by Lilly Brogi; which was published by Novecento di Firenze. It is a part of the 42nd volume of the Anthology "Poets and Contemporary Writers in the Mirror", with the story published for children: "La favola di Nose" (June 2017). With the 5th Premio Città di Sarzana he joined the International Literary Anthology 2017 with an excerpt from the book, "One Hundred Years of Unknown Heroism" (July 2017).
He has participated in numerous competitions receiving prizes throughout Italy.

in 2019 III Premio Nazionale “Novella Torregiani” special Prize of the President of the Jury with the story "After the destruction of the chapter library"., Price Città di Pontremoli Special testimonial Award for "Morire a Marcinelle",

Published works

Poetry anthologies

Stories anthologies

Awards and honors
 Finalist at the Prospektiva 2017 with the book "“Il sogno di un minatore” in Lucca.
 Special prize jury for the category narrative for boys at 42nd edition of Premio Letterario Casentino "Silvio Miano" 2017
 Finalist at Prize Raffaele Crovi 2018 at Castelnovo ne' Monti with the "Morire a Marcinelle".
 First place at Prize Rassegna d'arte e letteratura omaggio a Cortona 2018 at the category Stories
 Reporting poetry section literary award "Il canto delle muse" 2019.

References

External links
 Gossip e Spettacolo - Inciucio
 autori.ilcielocapovolto.info on Emanuele Corocher

Italian male writers
Living people
Writers from Verona
1971 births